Not On Our Watch: The Mission to End Genocide in Darfur and Beyond is a non-fiction book co-authored by actor Don Cheadle and human rights activist and co-founder of the Enough Project, John Prendergast.

Release and sales
A New York Times bestseller, the book discusses the situation in Sudan's Darfur region and other cases of mass atrocities. The book outlines ways in which ordinary citizens can take action to end ongoing tragedies in Darfur, northern Uganda, the Democratic Republic of Congo and elsewhere. Holocaust survivor Elie Wiesel contributed with a foreword, and then-Senator Barack Obama and Senator Sam Brownback wrote the book's introduction. A European/UK edition of the book was published by Maverick House Publishers in August 2007.

A portion of the proceeds are being donated to the Enough Project, a joint initiative of the International Crisis Group and the Center for American Progress to abolish genocide and mass atrocities.

See also
The Enough Moment: Fighting to End Africa's Worst Human Rights Crimes

References

External links
Enough Project
Not on Our Watch European/UK Edition
NPR story on the book
Not On Our Watch: George Clooney, Brad Pitt, Matt Damon, Don Cheadle, Jerry Weintraub

2007 non-fiction books
War in Darfur
Non-fiction books about Sudan
Current affairs books
Books about Africa
Collaborative non-fiction books